Phoenix Legend is a Chinese popular music duo, consisting of female vocalist Yangwei Linghua and male vocalist Zeng Yi. Their music blends folk music with rap and hip hop elements. In May 2012 Phoenix Legend was reported in the China Daily as having sold more than 6 million albums in China since 2005, and 10 songs from four of their albums have recorded one billion online hits.

Their song "Above the Moon" brought them national attention after they performed it on the television show Star Boulevard.

Songwriter Zhang Chao has also written three popular songs for the group, including The Most Dazzling Folk Style and Moon Over the Lotus Pond.

History 
In 1999, the duo first formed a group called Cool Fire, singing mostly Korean and American pop songs. Songwriter He Muyang heard Ling's voice on TV in 2003 and rewrote Above the Moonlight, a sentimental song he wrote in 1999 for the duo. In 2004, the group signed a contract with Peacock Bluehead and the song became a hit in 2005, after the group toured more than 20 universities in China.

In 2009 the duo had a major hit song entitled The Most Dazzling Folk Style (also translated as The Hottest Ethnic Trend or The Coolest Ethnic Trend). The same year they joined the Art Troupe of the Second Artillery Corps, with the duty of entertaining soldiers in the People's Liberation Army's nuclear weapons units.

The duo has gained some recognition outside China. The Most Dazzling Folk Style was used by cheerleaders during an NBA Houston Rockets game in April 2012 and also become an Internet sensation after being remixed and re-edited by fans.

Discography

Studio albums
Above the Moon (2005)
Good Fortune As You So Desire (2007)
The Most Dazzling Folk Style (2009)
Sing Loudly (2011)
The Best Era (2014)

Singles
"China's Tastes" (2012)

References

External links
Official Website
Phoenix Legend introduction and their music 
Website on Iting, Chinese music site

Chinese musical groups
Chinese pop music groups
Mandopop musical groups
Musical groups established in 1997
Pop music duos